Ivan Ćubelić (born 2 June 2003) is a Croatian footballer currently playing as a midfielder for Hajduk Split. He was included in The Guardian's "Next Generation 2020".

Career statistics

Club

Notes

References

2003 births
Living people
Footballers from Split, Croatia
Association football midfielders
Croatian footballers
Croatia youth international footballers
HNK Hajduk Split II players
HNK Hajduk Split players
NK Dugopolje players
First Football League (Croatia) players
Croatian Football League players